Kincraig railway station served the village of Kincraig, Highland, Scotland from 1863 to 1965 on the Inverness and Perth Junction Railway.

History 
The station opened as Boat of Insch on 9 September 1863 by the Inverness and Perth Junction Railway, it was renamed to Kincraig on 1 September 1871.

The station was host to a LMS caravan in 1938 and 1939 and possibly 1937.

The station closed to both passengers and goods traffic on 18 October 1965. Most of the up platform has been removed but the footbridge has survived as well as the building and wooden structure on the down platform.

References

External links 

Disused railway stations in Highland (council area)
Railway stations in Great Britain opened in 1863
Railway stations in Great Britain closed in 1965
1863 establishments in Scotland
1965 disestablishments in Scotland
Beeching closures in Scotland
Former Highland Railway stations